Louvroil is a commune in the Nord department in northern France. It lies adjacent to the southwest of Maubeuge.

Population

Heraldry

See also
Communes of the Nord department

References

Communes of Nord (French department)